The Phaloriinae is a subfamily of crickets (Orthoptera: Ensifera) of the family Phalangopsidae.  Species are terrestrial and are distributed in: Africa, tropical Asia, Korea, Australia and the Pacific Islands.

Tribes and Genera 
The Orthoptera Species File lists:
 tribe Phaloriini Gorochov, 1985
 Afrophaloria Desutter-Grandcolas, 2015
 Borneloria Gorochov, 2018
 Ceyloria Gorochov, 1996
 Gorochovius Xie, Zheng & Li, 2004
 Phaloria (insect) Stål, 1877
 Phasmagryllus Desutter-Grandcolas, 2015
 Pseudotrigonidium Chopard, 1915
 Strophiola Uvarov, 1940
 Sumatloria Gorochov, 2003
 Trellius Gorochov, 1988
 Tremellia Stål, 1877
 Upupagryllus Desutter-Grandcolas, 2015
 Vescelia Stål, 1877
 tribe Subtiloriini Gorochov, 2003
 Heterotrypus Saussure, 1878
 Kameruloria Gorochov, 2003
 Schizotrypus Chopard, 1954
 Subtiloria Gorochov, 1999
 unplaced monotypic genus† Electrogryllus Gorochov, 1992 - †E. septentrionalis (Chopard, 1936)

References

External links
 

Orthoptera subfamilies
Ensifera
crickets